WRFV (910 AM) was an American radio station licensed to Valdosta, Georgia, United States. The station was last owned by Rama Communications, Inc.

History
The station went on the air in 1951 as WGAF. The call letters changed to WFVR (Florida Vacation Radio) on June 1, 1986. On January 19, 2007, the station changed its call sign to WRFV (Radio Free Valdosta).

Citing financial reasons, the station notified the Federal Communications Commission that on July 1, 2011, it had suspended broadcasting. The station received permission to do so with instructions to resume broadcasting by July 1, 2012, or forfeit its license. The station's license was cancelled on October 1, 2019.

References

External links
FCC Station Search Details: DWRFV (Facility ID: 21807)
FCC History Cards for WRFV (covering 1945-1981 as WGAF)
 

RFV
Defunct radio stations in the United States
Radio stations disestablished in 2019
2019 disestablishments in Georgia (U.S. state)
1951 establishments in Georgia (U.S. state)
Radio stations established in 1951
RFV